Chebu AROB FC, full name Chebu Autonomous Region of Bougainville FC, is an association football club based in the autonomous region of Bougainville in Papua New Guinea. The club was founded in 2019.

The club is currently taking part in the 2019 edition of the Papua New Guinea National Soccer League, and have qualified for the playoffs following their top two placing in the Islands Conference.

History 
The club was founded in 2019 shortly before the start of the 2019 Papua New Guinea National Soccer League. Overseen by the Bougainville Football Federation, the club consists of players predominantly from the island of Bougainville, with some having experience at the PNG Games and the domestic Besta Cup, but none with experience at the top level of Papua New Guinean football. The club were drawn into the Islands Conference alongside four other teams.

The club started the season strongly, picking up an opening day 4–0 victory against Radazz, before a narrow 1–0 defeat to West Tribe FC would be their only defeat in the first half of the season. Going into the second half of the season in second place, they were defeated 3–2 by Radazz before a vital 3–2 victory over league leaders West Tribe. On 27 April 2019, the club qualified for the playoffs of the competition with a 2–1 victory over Vudal Gazelle.

The club were drawn against Eastern Stars, runners-up from the Southern Conference, in the playoff quarter-finals. The tie was originally intended to be played in Kokopo on 11 May 2019, but after 48 minutes, the game was abandoned due to a waterlogged pitch, with the score at 0–0. The game was eventually moved to Port Moresby on 16 May, where Stars won 2–0 to end AROB's season.

Domestic Record

National Competitions 

 Papua New Guinea National Soccer League
2019: Quarter-Finals

Current squad

References 

Football clubs in Papua New Guinea
Association football clubs established in 2019
2019 establishments in Papua New Guinea